Ants Kiviselg (born 13 July 1955 in Pärnu) is an Estonian sport physician and military personnel.

In 1979 he graduated from Tartu State University in medicine.

From 1990 to 1996 he was the head physician and the leader of sport medicine centre Dünamix. From 1984 to 2001 he was a physician for Estonian rowing team.

Since 1993 he has been also active in Estonian Defence Forces. From 2000 to 2001 he was Commandant of the Estonian National Defence College.

Awards
 2006: Order of the Cross of the Eagle, III class.

References

Living people
1955 births
Estonian people in sports
Estonian physicians
Estonian military personnel
University of Tartu alumni
People from Pärnu